Pearl Harbor: Defend the Fleet is an action video game developed by WayForward and published by WizardWorks for Windows.

Gameplay
Pearl Harbor: Defend the Fleet is a game in which the player shoots down waves of Japanese planes.

Reception
Jeff Lundrigan reviewed the PC version of the game for Next Generation, rating it one star out of five, and stated that "Good for a waste of 10 minutes and $20. That's about it."

Reviews
IGN - Jun 12, 2001
GameStar - Jul, 2001
GameSpot - May 30, 2001

References

2001 video games
Pacific War video games
Shooter video games
Video games developed in the United States
Video games set in Hawaii
WayForward games
Windows games
Windows-only games
WizardWorks games
World War II video games